James Henry Gooding (August 28, 1838 – July 19, 1864) was a Corporal in the 54th Massachusetts Volunteer Infantry, an American Civil War Union regiment, and a war correspondent to the New Bedford, MA Mercury newspaper.

Biography 
James Henry Gooding was born into slavery on August 28, 1838, in North Carolina. At a very young age his freedom was purchased by a James M. Gooding, who may have been his father, and he was sent to New York City. On September 11, 1846, Gooding was enrolled as a student in the New York Colored Orphan's Asylum, a prominent school and boarding house run primarily by Quaker women. There he received a classical education and became a proficient and prolific writer, a talent which would serve him for the rest of his life. From 1850 to 1852 he was indentured out of the Asylum to work for an Albert Westlake. As he approached adulthood he made the decision to hide his past as a slave, and began telling people he was born free in Troy, New York. In 1856, at the age of 18, he took a job on board a whaling ship out of New Bedford, Massachusetts.

Whaling was one of the few industries at that time in which an African-American man could find employment on equal footing with whites. He often composed poetry describing life at sea on whaling ships. During his voyages he made as much as $20 per month, a salary equivalent to an officer on board ship. He gave up whaling in the fall of 1862, when he settled down in New Bedford and married Ellen Allen in the Seamen's Bethel, a prominent church in the city.

Six days before Gooding's marriage, President Abraham Lincoln announced the Emancipation Proclamation, which took effect January 1, 1863, and opened the door for the enlistment of African Americans into the Union armies.  On February 10, 1863, the 54th Massachusetts Volunteer Infantry recruiting office in New Bedford opened, and on February 14, Gooding enlisted as a member of Company C. In September 1863, James Gooding wrote a letter to Abraham Lincoln. His letters talked about how he was tired of being paid only ten dollars a month compared to the thirteen dollars a month that white soldiers received, and far less than the twenty dollars he had earned on his last voyage at sea. He demanded equal pay for his work. He was well regarded, and promoted to corporal in December, 1863.  He fought steadfastly with the regiment, in the midst of the assault on Fort Wagner in Charleston Harbor on July 18, 1863, and in the battle of Oustlee, Florida, on February 20, 1864 where he was shot and presumed to be dead. In the latter battle, his commander sent notification to the editors of the Mercury that he was killed in battle and his wife applied for a pension in April. He was, however, not dead. Wounded in the thigh, Gooding was taken to Andersonville in early March 1864, where he died as a prisoner of war on July 19, 1864. He is buried in grave 3,585 in the Andersonville National Cemetery. Unknown to him at the time of his death, Congress had passed the law in June 1864 granting equal pay to African American soldiers.

See also 
54th Massachusetts Volunteer Infantry

References 

1838 births
1864 deaths
War correspondents of the American Civil War
People of Massachusetts in the American Civil War
African Americans in the American Civil War
Union Army non-commissioned officers
Union military personnel killed in the American Civil War
American Civil War prisoners of war